Todd Rogers (born December 1, 1964) is an American video game player who has been described as the first professional video game player. In 1986, he was invited to be part of the U.S. National Video Game Team. He had previously been recognized by Activision for having achieved many record-setting high scores, but many of his records were later disputed for a lack of verifying evidence or found to be impossible to achieve. In January 2018, the Twin Galaxies record database removed all of his scores from their leaderboards and banned him permanently, and Guinness World Records stripped his records.

Disputed records 
Several of Todd Rogers' records have come under scrutiny for being seemingly impossible or lacking sufficient proof. In 2002, Robert Mruczek, then chief referee at Twin Galaxies, officially rescinded Todd's record time in Barnstorming after other players pointed out that his time of 32.04 seconds did not appear to be possible, even when the game was hacked to remove all obstacles. Upon further investigation, Twin Galaxies referees were unable to find independent verification for this time, having instead been relying on erroneous information from Activision.

As listed on the Twin Galaxies leaderboard until January 2018, Rogers's record in the 1980 Activision game Dragster was a time of 5.51 seconds from 1982. At the time, Activision verified high scores by Polaroid. According to Rogers, after he submitted a photo of this time, he was called by Activision who asked him to verify how he achieved such a score, because they had programmed a 'perfect run' of the game and were unable to achieve better than a 5.54. The game's programmer David Crane would later confirm that he had a vague recollection of programming test runs, but didn't remember the results. In 2012, Todd received a Guinness World Record for the longest-standing video game score record, for his 1982 Dragster record. In 2017, a speedrunner named Eric "Omnigamer" Koziel disassembled the game's code and concluded that the fastest possible time was 5.57 seconds. With a tick time of 0.03s the record claim is two ticks faster than Omnigamer's data and one tick faster than the reported Activision 'perfect run'.

Prior to 2018, several other Todd Rogers scores had been individually disputed or removed as well, including his score of 15 million points in the Atari 2600 port of Donkey Kong (the record at the time was only 1.4 million), and his score on Centipede for the Atari 5200, for which he claimed a score of exactly 65,000,000, with the next-best-recorded score being 58,078. Other disputed scores included Wabbit, where he had a recorded score of 1,698 despite the score only increases in increments of 5 (and where the game normally ends when the player reaches 1,300 points); Fathom, where, based upon other players' verified scores and playtimes, his claimed record would have taken over 325 hours (13.5 days) of play to achieve; and The Legendary Axe, in which his claimed score is 99,999,990 despite the game score only progressing in increments of 50.

On January 23, 2018, Twin Galaxies posted an interview with Activision's David Crane, programmer of Dragster, who expressed that he had no "doubt that [Rogers] achieved the scores he claims". Around the same time, YouTuber Apollo Legend posted a video of evidence they had gathered from multiple sources and called upon Twin Galaxies to take action against Rogers's scores, while Twin Galaxies had an ongoing investigation. On January 29, 2018, in the wake of many disputes being raised and several scores being proven impossible, Twin Galaxies decided to remove all of his scores and ban him from the site entirely. They notified Guinness World Records regarding their decision. The next day, Guinness stripped all of Rogers' records.

See also
 Billy Mitchell
 Cheating in video games

References 

1964 births
Living people
People from Brooksville, Florida
School of the Art Institute of Chicago alumni
People from Chicago
Video game controversies
American confidence tricksters